The 2016 Soho Square Ladies Tournament was a professional tennis tournament played on outdoor hard courts. It was the 2nd edition of the tournament and part of the 2016 ITF Women's Circuit, offering a total of $100,000 in prize money. It took place in Sharm el-Sheikh, Egypt, on 17–23 October 2016.

Singles main draw entrants

Seeds 

 1 Rankings as of 10 October 2016.

Other entrants 
The following player received a wildcard into the singles main draw:
  Ola Abou Zekry
  Lamis Alhussein Abdel Aziz
  Vitalia Diatchenko
  Ana Bianca Mihăilă

The following players received entry from the qualifying draw:
  Jaqueline Cristian
  Giulia Gatto-Monticone
  Julia Wachaczyk
  Dayana Yastremska

The following player received entry by a lucky loser spot:
  Sandra Samir

Champions

Singles

 Donna Vekić def.  Sara Sorribes Tormo, 6–2, 6–7(7–9), 6–3

Doubles

 Irina Maria Bara /  Alona Fomina def.  Guadalupe Pérez Rojas /  Jil Teichmann, 6–2, 6–1

External links 
 2016 Soho Square Ladies Tournament at ITFtennis.com

2016 ITF Women's Circuit
2016 in Egyptian sport
Tennis tournaments in Egypt